Natriuretic peptide receptor B/guanylate cyclase B (atrionatriuretic peptide receptor B), also known as NPR2, is an atrial natriuretic peptide receptor. In humans it is encoded by the NPR2 gene.

A mutation of the NPR2 gene can result in disproportionate dwarfism with short limbs.

See also 
 Atrial natriuretic peptide receptor
Dwarfism

References

Further reading

External links 
 

EC 4.6.1